Free Agent is the second studio album by American rapper Joell Ortiz. It was released on February 22, 2011, through E1 Music in the United States after being pushed back. It is the follow-up to his previous album The Brick: Bodega Chronicles (2007).

The album had leaked on the internet 3 months early via Amazon.com, but was later taken down. Joell Ortiz was trying to be released from E1, formally Koch Records, to sign to Shady Records as part of the super group Slaughterhouse. On November 4, 2010 Joell stated through his Twitter account that he was off of E1 Music, but Free Agent was still released through the label. The album features production from DJ Premier, Large Professor, Knobody, DJ Khalil, Sean C & LV, Mr. 187, Broadway, Dookie Fingazz, Nottz, Frank Dukes and Yuri Zwadiuk. Guests are The Lox, Just Blaze, Dookie Fingazz.

Commercial reception
The album debuted at #173 on the Billboard 200 with 4,000 copies sold in its first week released.

Track listing

Charts

References

2011 albums
Joell Ortiz albums
E1 Music albums
Albums produced by Grind Music
Albums produced by DJ Khalil
Albums produced by Nottz
Albums produced by Large Professor
Albums produced by Just Blaze
Albums produced by DJ Premier